Kiese Laymon  (born August 15, 1974, Jackson, Mississippi) is a Black southern writer from Jackson, Mississippi. He is a professor of English and Creative Writing at Rice University. He is the author of three full-length books: a novel, Long Division (2013), and two memoirs, How to Slowly Kill Yourself and Others in America (2013) and the award-winning Heavy: An American Memoir (2018). Laymon was awarded a "Genius Grant" from the MacArthur Fellows Program in 2022.

Early life and education
Laymon was born and raised in Mississippi. He earned his Bachelor of Arts degree at Oberlin College, and his Master's in Fine Arts at Indiana University. He also attended Jackson State University, where his mother worked as a political science professor, and Millsaps College, where he was suspended for a year after taking a library book without checking it out. His suspension followed ongoing criticism from the administration, including president George Harmon, who believed his controversial pieces on race in the school newspaper adversely affected campus and alumni relations.

Writing career
Laymon detailed his experience of racism at Millsaps, and as a coming-of-age black man in Mississippi, in his essay for Gawker, "How to Slowly Kill Yourself and Others in America". The essay was widely read and attracted both positive and negative comments on his portrayal of his racial experiences. "How to Slowly Kill Yourself and Others" was eventually included in his book of autobiographical essays by the same name.

His 2018 memoir, Heavy: An American Memoir, deals with his difficult relationship with his mother—who instilled in him a love of reading and discipline and skill in writing, but who was in an abusive relationship and lived on very little money, and who beat Laymon with the justification that he needed to be tough enough for a white world that would treat him even more harshly—as well as his subsequent unhealthy relationships with food and gambling. It also  deals with American racism, feminism, family, masculinity, geography, hip-hop, and Southern black life. His blog, Cold Drank, features essays and short fiction as well as pieces written by guest contributors. Laymon has written essays and stories for publications including Gawker, ESPN.com, The Washington Post, the New York Times, NPR, BuzzFeed, and The Guardian.

Writing for NPR, Martha Anne Toll described Laymon as "a star in the American literary firmament, with a voice that is courageous, honest, loving, and singularly beautiful. Heavy is at once a paean to the Deep South, a condemnation of our fat-averse culture, and a brilliantly rendered memoir of growing up black, and bookish, and entangled in a family that is as challenging as it is grounding."

While he was living and writing in upstate New York, as a professor at Vassar College, Laymon's refusal to omit explicit aspects of Long Division that explore racial politics prolonged negotiations with a major publishing group. His books were eventually picked up by the independent publisher Agate Publishing, which released his debut novel in June 2013.

In addition to Laymon's satirical time-travel novel Long Division, his book of autobiographical essays, How to Slowly Kill Yourself and Others in America, was published by Agate in August 2013.

Academia

Laymon was an associate professor of English and Africana Studies at Vassar College, then became a professor of Creative Writing in the MFA program at the University of Mississippi.

 he is professor of English and Creative Writing at Rice University.

Awards and recognition
 2013 & 2014: Member of The Root 100, a "list of the 100 most important black influencers between the ages of 25 and 45" 
2018: Los Angeles Times – Christopher Isherwood Prize for Autobiographical Prose, for Heavy: An American Memoir
2019:  2019 Andrew Carnegie Medal for Excellence in Nonfiction for Heavy: An American Memoir
2022: MacArthur Fellows Program

Selected works 

Novels

 Long Division (2013), 

Memoirs

 How to Slowly Kill Yourself and Others in America (2013), 
 Heavy: An American Memoir (2018),

References 

1974 births
Living people
African-American novelists
American male novelists
Indiana University Bloomington alumni
Jackson State University alumni
Millsaps College alumni
Oberlin College alumni
Writers from Jackson, Mississippi
Vassar College faculty
21st-century American novelists
21st-century American male writers
Novelists from Mississippi
Novelists from New York (state)
21st-century African-American writers
20th-century African-American people
African-American male writers
Vanity Fair (magazine) people